The 2017 independent.ie Fitzgibbon Cup was the 101st staging of the Fitzgibbon Cup since its establishment in 1912. The semi-finals and final were hosted by NUI Galway on 24 and 25 February 2017. Mary I retained the title after a 3–24 to 1–19 win against IT Carlow in the final.

Format

Group stage

Sixteen institutes of higher education compete in groups of four. Each team in a group plays all the other teams in the group once. Two points are awarded for a win and one for a draw.

Knockout stage

The four group winners play the four group runners-up in the quarter-finals. The semi-finals and final are played over a single weekend, usually the last Friday and Saturday in February.

Group stage

Group A

{| class="wikitable" 
!width=20|
!width=150 style="text-align:left;"|Team
!width=20|
!width=20|
!width=20|
!width=20|
!width=40|
!width=50|
!width=20|
!width=20|
|-
|1||align=left| Mary I Limerick ||3||2||1||0||7-77||1-42||53||5
|-
|2||align=left| IT Carlow ||3||2||1||0||10-56||1-44||39||5
|- 
|3||align=left| DIT ||3||1||0||2||5-38||9-57||-31||2
|-
|4||align=left| GMIT ||3||0||0||3||0-38||11-66||-61||0
|}

Group B

{| class="wikitable" 
!width=20|
!width=150 style="text-align:left;"|Team
!width=20|
!width=20|
!width=20|
!width=20|
!width=40|
!width=50|
!width=20|
!width=20|
|-
|1||align=left| UL ||2||2||0||0||4-44||2-28||22||4
|-
|2||align=left| NUI Galway ||2||1||0||1||6-26||3-33||2||2
|-
|3||align=left| CIT ||2||1||0||1||1-30||2-31||-2||2
|-
|4||align=left| DCU St Patricks Campus ||2||0||0||2||1-18||5-28||-22||0
|}

Group C

{| class="wikitable" 
!width=20|
!width=150 style="text-align:left;"|Team
!width=20|
!width=20|
!width=20|
!width=20|
!width=40|
!width=50|
!width=20|
!width=20|
|-
|1||align=left| Limerick IT ||2||2||0||0||6-33||0-22||29||4
|-
|2||align=left| WIT ||2||1||0||1||5-25||2-22||12||2
|-
|3||align=left| DCU Dóchas Éireann ||2||1||0||1||1-29||3-22||1||2
|-
|4||align=left| Trinity College Dublin ||2||0||0||2||1-15||8-36||-42||0
|}

Group D

{| class="wikitable" 
!width=20|
!width=150 style="text-align:left;"|Team
!width=20|
!width=20|
!width=20|
!width=20|
!width=40|
!width=50|
!width=20|
!width=20|
|-
|1||align=left| UCC ||3||3||0||0||6-43||3-23||29||6
|- 
|2||align=left| UCD ||3||2||0||1||2-51||1-26||28||4
|-
|3||align=left| Maynooth University ||3||1||0||2||4-50||1-50||9||2
|-
|4||align=left| UUJ ||3||0||0||3||3-16||10-61||-66||0
|}

Knockout stage

Quarter-finals
Group winners had home advantage for the quarter-finals.

Semi-finals

Final

References

External links
 gaa.ie Higher Education Fixtures

Fitzgibbon
Fitzgibbon Cup